Industrial Strength is the fifth studio album by the avant garde band Borbetomagus. It was released in 1983 through Leo Records.

Track listing

Personnel 
Adapted from Industrial Strength liner notes.

Borbetomagus
 Don Dietrich – saxophone
 Donald Miller – electric guitar
 Jim Sauter – saxophone

Additional musicians
 Milo Fine – piano, clarinet
 Tristan Honsinger – cello, voice
 Toshinori Kondo – trumpet, voice
 Peter Kowald – bass guitar

Release history

References

External links 
 Work on What Has Been Spoiled at Discogs (list of releases)

1983 albums
Borbetomagus albums
Leo Records albums